27S pre-rRNA (guanosine2922-2'-O)-methyltransferase (Spb1p (gene), YCL054W (gene)) is an enzyme with systematic name S-adenosyl-L-methionine:27S pre-rRNA (guanosine2922-2'-O-)-methyltransferase. This enzyme catalyses the following chemical reaction

 S-adenosyl-L-methionine + guanosine2922 in 27S pre-rRNA  S-adenosyl-L-homocysteine + 2'-O-methylguanosine2922 in 27S pre-rRNA

Spb1p is a site-specific 2'-O-ribose RNA methyltransferase that catalyses the formation of 2'-O-methylguanosine2922.

References

External links 
 

EC 2.1.1